Habib Bank Plaza, also known as HBL Plaza, located on I. I. Chundrigar Road in Karachi, Sindh, Pakistan, is the head office of Habib Bank Limited. It was once the tallest building in Asia, a title that hasn't been held by any other building in South Asia, and was one of only three to hold the title outside of East and Southeast Asia, while still under construction between 1963 and 1968. It was also the tallest building in South Asia until 1972, being surpassed by the Express Towers. It remained the tallest building in Pakistan for four decades until the 29-floor and 116m tall MCB Tower was built.

HBL Plaza was inaugurated to mark the 25th anniversary of the bank, and started its operations on 4 September 1971. The Ruet-e-Hilal Committee has regularly used the building over the years to call the meeting for moon sighting. As of 2021, it housed more than 1,770 employees.

See also 
 Economy of Pakistan
 List of tallest buildings in Pakistan
 List of tallest buildings in Karachi

References

External links 

 Habib Bank Limited official website

Towers in Karachi
Skyscrapers in Karachi
Office buildings in Karachi
Skyscraper office buildings
Office buildings completed in 1972
Skyscrapers in Sindh
Skyscrapers in Pakistan